Aglossa thamii is a species of snout moth in the genus Aglossa. It was described by Patrice J.A. Leraut in 2003 and is known from Morocco.

References

Moths described in 2003
Pyralini
Endemic fauna of Morocco
Moths of Africa